Karen Barkey is the Haas Distinguished Chair of Religious Diversity at the Othering & Belonging Institute and a professor of sociology at University of California, Berkeley. She is also the director of the Center for the Study of Democracy, Toleration, and Religion (CDTR) at UC Berkeley. She was previously a professor of sociology and history at Columbia University. She was awarded the Germaine Tillion Chair of Mediterranean studies at IMéRA for 2021–2022.

Education 
Karen Barkey holds a Ph.D. from the University of Chicago, an M.A. from the University of Washington, Seattle, and an A.B. from Bryn Mawr College.

Personal 
Barkey was born in Istanbul, Turkey.

Scientific contributions
Barkey studies state centralization/decentralization, state control and social movements against states in the context of empires. Her research focuses primarily on the Ottoman Empire and recently on comparisons between Ottoman, Habsburg and Roman empires.

She is engaged in different projects on religion and toleration. She has written on the early centuries of Ottoman state toleration and is now exploring different ways of understanding how religious coexistence, toleration and sharing occurred in different historical sites under Ottoman rule. She directs a web-based project on shared sacred sites.

Barkey was awarded the Germaine Tillion Chair of Mediterranean studies at IMéRA, for 2021–2022. IMéRA is the Institute for Advanced Study of Aix-Marseille University, and a member of the French Network of Institutes for Advanced Study.

Shared Sacred Sites
Shared Sacred Sites is a collaborative project that seeks to develop a rubric for the description, classification, analysis, and publication of work relating to spaces and locations used by multiple, disparate communities for religious purposes.

Part of the project is a traveling international Shared Sacred Sites Exhibition, which was hosted at the Museum of European and Mediterranean Civilisations in Marseilles, France (2015), the Bardo National Museum in Tunis, Tunisia (2016), Macedonian Museum of Contemporary Art, Thessaloniki Museum of Photography, and Yeni Cami (also known as New Mosque (Thessaloniki) in Thessaloniki, Greece. An exhibition catalogue, Shared Sacred Sites in the Balkans and in the Mediterranean, co-edited with Dionigi Albera, Dimitris Papadopoulos and Manoël Pénicaud, was published by the Macedonian Museum of Contemporary Art Publications in 2018.

In March 2018, the exhibition opened at the New York Public Library, Graduate Center, CUNY, and Morgan Library & Museum in New York. An exhibition catalogue, Shared Sacred Sites: A Contemporary Pilgrimage, co-edited with Dionigi Albera and Manöel Pénicaud, was published by CUNY Publications in 2018.

Selected bibliography
 Karen Barkey, Sudipta Kaviraj, and Vatsal Naresh, eds., Negotiating Democracy and Religious Pluralism: India, Pakistan and Turkey. Oxford University Press. Forthcoming. 
Dionigi Albera, Karen Barkey, and Manoël Pénicaud, eds., Shared Sacred Sites: A Contemporary Pilgrimage. CUNY Publications, 2018. 
Dionigi Albera, Karen Barkey, Dimitris Papadopoulos and Manoël Pénicaud, eds., Shared Sacred Sites in the Balkans and in the Mediterranean. Macedonian Museum of Contemporary Art Publications, 2018.
 Barkey, Karen, and George Gavrilis. 2015. "The Ottoman Millet System: Non-Territorial Autonomy and its Legacy Today". Ethnopolitics. 
 Barkey, Karen, and Elazar Barkan. 2014. Choreographies of Shared Sacred Sites: Religion, Politics, & Conflict Resolution. New York, NY: Columbia University Press.
 Barkey, Karen, and Frédéric Godart. 2013. "Empires, Federated Arrangements and Kingdoms: Using Political Models of Governance to Understand Firms' Creative Performance". Organization Studies 34:79–104.
 Barkey, Karen. 2008. Empire of Difference: The Ottomans in Comparative Perspective. Cambridge, UK: Cambridge University Press.
 Barkey, Karen, and Ronan Van Rossem. 1997. "Networks of Contention: Villages and Regional Structure in the Seventeenth-Century Ottoman Empire". American Journal of Sociology 102:1345–82.
 Barkey, Karen, and Mark von Hagen. 1997. After empire: multiethnic societies and nation-building: the Soviet Union and the Russian, Ottoman and Habsburg empires. Boulder, CO: Westview Press.
 Barkey, Karen. 1996. "In Different Times: Scheduling and Social Control in the Ottoman Empire, 1550 to 1650". Comparative Studies in Society and History 38:460–483.
 Barkey, Karen. 1994. Bandits and Bureaucrats: The Ottoman Route to State Centralization. Ithaca, NY: Cornell University Press.

References

External links
 
Shared Sacred Sites website

1959 births
Living people
Bryn Mawr College alumni
University of Washington alumni
University of Chicago alumni
Columbia University faculty
Turkish emigrants to the United States
American sociologists
American women sociologists
21st-century American women